The International Association of Insurance Supervisors (IAIS) is a voluntary membership organization of insurance supervisors from over 190 jurisdictions, constituting 97% of the world's insurance premiums. It is the international standards-setting body for the insurance sector. The IAIS was established in 1994 and operates as a verein, a type of non-profit organisation under Swiss Civil Law.

The IAIS' mission is to promote effective and globally consistent supervision of the insurance industry in order to develop and maintain fair, safe and stable insurance markets for the benefit and protection of policyholders and to contribute to the maintenance of global financial stability.

Structure
The IAIS' activities are supported by its secretariat and headed by a secretary general. The IAIS is hosted by the Bank for International Settlements (BIS).

The IAIS works in partnership with BIS-hosted committees such as the Basel Committee on Banking Supervision (BCBS) and the Committee on Payments and Market Infrastructure (CPMI), as well as other BIS-hosted entities such as the Financial Stability Board (FSB), the Financial Stability Institute (FSI) and the International Association of Deposit Insurers (IADI). The IAIS also works closely with other standard-setting bodies not hosted by the BIS, such as the International Organisation of Securities Commissions (IOSCO).

Committees
The IAIS delivers on its mission through a committee system made up of its members. The Committee system is led by an executive committee whose 38 members come from different regions of the world, representing advanced and developing insurance markets.

The executive committee is supported by the following five Committees established under its by-laws:

 Audit and Risk Committee;
 Budget Committee;
 Implementation and Assessment Committee;
 Macroprudential Committee; and
 Policy Development Committee.

Committees may establish subcommittees to help carry out their duties.

Activities
Guided by its strategic plan, the IAIS develops a two-year roadmap setting out the specific projects that the IAIS will undertake over the next two years. Projects and activities contained within the roadmap can be broadly divided into three categories:
 Standard setting: The IAIS develops supervisory material (principles, standards and guidance) for effective supervision of insurance-related activities. Notably, the IAIS has developed the Insurance Core Principles (ICPs) and the Common Framework for the Supervision of Internationally Active Insurance Groups (ComFrame). The ICPs provide the globally accepted standards for supervision of the insurance sector. ComFrame builds on the ICPs and establishes supervisory standards and guidance focusing on the effective group-wide supervision of Internationally Active Insurance Groups (IAIGs). In 2019, the IAIS also published version 2.0 of the Insurance Capital Standard  and the Holistic Framework for the Assessment and Mitigation of Systemic Risk in the Insurance Sector.  The IAIS also develops supporting material to supplement its supervisory material and provide additional background on specific areas of interest to insurance supervisors.
 Implementation and Assessment: The IAIS actively promotes the implementation of its supervisory material. Working closely with international organisations and regional groups of supervisors, it supports training seminars and conferences, as well as initiatives to support financial inclusion. In addition, the IAIS conducts assessments and peer reviews of observance of supervisory material, consistent with the Financial Sector Assessment Program (FSAP) conducted by the International Monetary Fund (IMF) and the World Bank.
 Financial stability: The IAIS has a role in the identification, assessment and mitigation of systemic risk in the insurance sector. Activities in the area of financial stability include monitoring global insurance market trends and developments and detecting the possible build-up of systemic risk in the global insurance sector, as well as analyzing and developing IAIS supervisory and supporting material on issues related to financial stability, systemic risk and macroprudential supervision. It assists its Members in developing enhanced macroprudential surveillance tools.

Financial sector coordination
The IAIS coordinates its work with other standard-setting bodies, international financial policymakers and associations of supervisors or regulators. In particular, the IAIS is a member of the:
Financial Stability Board (FSB)
 Member of the Standards Advisory Council of the International Accounting Standards Board (IASB)

The IAIS also participates as an observer or partner with numerous other organisations, including the Arab Union of Insurance Regulatory Commissions (AUIRC), Asian Forum of Insurance Regulators (AFIR), Association of Latin American Insurance Supervisors (ASSAL), Consultative Group to Assist the Poor (CGAP), European Insurance and Occupational Pensions Authority (EIOPA), Financial Action Task Force (FATF), International Actuarial Association (IAA), International Organisation of Pension Supervisors (IOPS), Islamic Financial Services Board (IFSB), National Association of Insurance Commissioners (NAIC), Group of International Insurance Centre Supervisors (GIICS), the Insurance and Private Pensions Committee (IPPC) of the Organisation for Cooperation and Development (OECD), and the G20/OECD Financial Consumer Protection Task Force.

The IAIS is also a founding partner of the Access to Insurance Initiative, a multi-stakeholder partnership with the mission to inspire and support insurance supervisors to promote inclusive and responsible insurance.

Meetings and events
The IAIS holds Committee meetings three times a year, as well as subcommittee meetings as needed. At its June meetings, the IAIS hosts a Global Seminar offering insurance supervisors and stakeholders an opportunity to discuss current and globally significant matters impacting the insurance sector, as well as the IAIS’ most recent activities.

The IAIS also holds an Annual Conference which is open to supervisors and stakeholders to discuss topical issues and progress on IAIS activities. In conjunction with this conference, it convenes an Annual General Meeting of Members where it conducts official business.

Due to the Covid-19 crisis, all in-person meetings have been cancelled or replaced with virtual events through to the end of 2020.

Publications

The IAIS also regularly publishes supporting material in the form of Application Papers and Issues Papers. Recently published papers have covered a wide range of topics, including sustainability and climate risk, corporate governance, fair treatment of customers, cyber risk and Fintech.

The IAIS financial stability activities are supported by an annual publication of the Global Insurance Market Report (GIMAR). The GIMAR contains a general description of developments in the global insurance sector as well as the outcome of the IAIS annual global monitoring exercise, i.e. the IAIS assessment of systemic risk in the global insurance sector. Finally, it includes the outcomes of an annual survey on the global reinsurance market.

The IAIS publishes a regular newsletter outlining recent and upcoming activities.

See also
Insurance law
Bank regulation
Financial regulation
Joint Forum

References

External links
 IAIS Website

Financial regulation
International finance institutions
Insurance industry organizations